Danny Daniels,  (October 25, 1924 – July 9, 2017), born Daniel Giagni, Jr., was an American choreographer, tap dancer, and a dance  teacher.

Daniels was a featured dancer in several 1940s Broadway musicals, including Billion Dollar Baby, Street Scene, and Kiss Me, Kate.  Although he continued performing during the 1950s and after, including a tour with the Agnes de Mille Dance Theatre, Daniels quickly moved into choreography for stage, film, and television.  He won a Tony Award and an Astaire Award in 1984 for The Tap Dance Kid and received three more Tony nominations for High Spirits, Walking Happy, and the 1967 revival of Annie Get Your Gun.  

Daniels' notable film choreography credits include Pennies from Heaven (1981), Indiana Jones and the Temple of Doom (1984), The Night They Raided Minsky's (1968), and Zelig (1983). He also choreographed the dance sequences and dubbed the tap sound effects for the movie musical Stepping Out (1991) starring Liza Minnelli. For television he worked on The Judy Garland Show (1963), as well as specials featuring performers such as Gene Kelly and Danny Kaye.  In 1952, he created the Tap Dance Concerto with composer Morton Gould. 

Daniels' students included Christopher Walken. 

Daniels died on July 9, 2017 at the age of 92.

Filmography as performer

References

External links
 
 
 
 Brief interview

1924 births
2017 deaths
20th-century American male actors
American choreographers
American male dancers
American male film actors
American male musical theatre actors
American tap dancers
Tony Award winners